BMW South Africa (Pty) Ltd. is an automobile manufacturer based in Rosslyn, South Africa. The company is part of the BMW group.

History
As early as 1929, the first BMW motorcycle was imported to South Africa by a private individual. The first cars of the brand in 1952 was a BMW 501.

However, the assembly of BMW automobiles did not begin until 1968 by Praetor Monteerders in Rosslyn. The company also assembled Jeep models. In 1970, BMW bought shares in Praetor Monteerders to completely take it over in 1975, thus establishing BMW South Africa, and was also the first BMW plant outside of Germany.

After an investment of 3.5 billion rand at the beginning of the new millennium, the Rosslyn plant was regarded as the most modern automobile plant in the southern hemisphere.

Models
The first models produced were the BMW 1800 SA (from 1968) or 2000 SA (from 1969) derived from the Glas 1700. First, the assembly took place from CKD-kits, which were sent to the production facilities to South Africa. In 1973, the optically revised models 1804 and 2004 followed, which were only built for one year.

From 1974, the BMW 5 Series was produced in South Africa from CKD kits. This series existed until 1985, after which the interior and the engines of the new series E28 were received from 1982. The new series E28 was also replaced later than in Germany (1989) by the series E34, which was the last 5 Series produced in South Africa.

Production of the BMW 745i began in 1983. The vehicle was powered by the 3.5-liter engine of the BMW M1 and at the time was the fastest BMW 7 in the world. By 1986, 192 vehicles of this type were to be manufactured.

The BMW 333i with 6 cylinders and 3.2 L displacement produced from 1986 (according to another source 1985 to 1987) was also only produced in South Africa. It emerged in this type with 204 to 215 vehicles.

South African BMW 3 Series models have also been exported to Australia since 1994 and to other countries since 1999. After the take over of the Rover Group, the marketing and producing of Land Rover vehicles began.

In South Africa, the BMW Group has the largest market share outside Germany, with 7.8% (2006). In 2011, around three quarters of production was exported. The production was limited to the 3 series.

Since 2018, the X3 (G01) series has been manufactured in Rosslyn (in addition to the production in Spartanburg). At the same time, the production of the 3 series ended after 1,191,604 copies and five model generations.

Car of the Year 
BMW models have already been named Car of the Year by the South African Motor Journalists Association (SAGMJ) seven times.
 1988:	BMW 735i
 1990:	BMW 525i
 1993:	BMW 316i
 1997: BMW 528i
 2001: BMW 320d 
 2006:	BMW 3 Series
 2011:	BMW 530d

References

External links 

 Official Website

BMW
Car manufacturers of South Africa
Manufacturing companies based in the City of Tshwane
Vehicle manufacturing companies established in 1975
South African companies established in 1975
South African subsidiaries of foreign companies